This article is a listing of all official releases by Therion, a Swedish metal group. As of 2018, the band have released 18 studio albums.

Albums

Studio albums

EPs

Compilation albums

Singles

Demos

Live albums

Video albums

Music videos

See also
 Therion audio samples

Notes and references

Therion
Discography
Discographies of Swedish artists